Meharia fischeri is a moth in the family Cossidae. It is found in Morocco.

References

Moths described in 2008
Meharia
Endemic fauna of Morocco
Moths of Africa